Joe Jacobs (m. 1983) is an English actor. Jacobs has appeared in Prime Suspect series 5 as Campbell Lafferty,  The Bill, Holby City and is best known for his role as PC Billy Jackson in the BBC police drama HolbyBlue.

The son of actor Clarke Peters, and grandson of broadcaster David Jacobs, he was in Night & Day (2001), The Lives of the Saints (2006), and The Commander.

References

External links

1983 births
Black British male actors
English male television actors
English people of American descent
Jewish English male actors
British Jews
English people of African-American descent
Living people
Place of birth missing (living people)